The Provincial Deputation of Huelva is the institution charged with the government and administration of the Spanish province of Huelva.

History 
Even though there was a spell of trial of the provincial deputations across Spain during the 1820–1823 Trienio Liberal, the current organization in the province of Huelva was constituted on 16 November 1835. The provincial deputies originally represented the judicial districts of Huelva, Aracena, La Palma del Condado Ayamonte, Moguer and El Cerro del Andévalo, the latter of which was replaced in 1847 by that of Valverde del Camino.

References 

Huelva
Province of Huelva